Bembecia flavida is a moth of the family Sesiidae. It is found on Sicily and in North Africa, including Algeria, Morocco and Tunisia.

The wingspan is 21–22 mm.

The larvae possibly feed on Ononis natrix.

References

Moths described in 1890
Sesiidae
Moths of Europe
Moths of Africa